Calyciphora homoiodactyla is a moth of the family Pterophoridae. It is found in France, the Czech Republic, Croatia, Bulgaria, Greece, Russia and Asia Minor.

The larvae feed on Echinops species, including southern globethistle (Echinops ritro).

References

Pterophorini
Moths described in 1960
Moths of Asia
Plume moths of Europe